Pleroma pereirae is a species of flowering plant in the family Melastomataceae, native to Brazil. It was first described in 1961 as Tibouchina pereirae.

References

pereirae
Flora of Brazil
Plants described in 1961